Shanthakumari Nambiar (born 22 May 1951), known by her stage name Seema, is an Indian actress. She has acted in 260 films in Malayalam, 25 in Tamil, 7 in Telugu, 6 in Kannada and one in Hindi. Veteran actor Vijayan gave her the screen name Seema.Bringing a remarkable change in the style of acting from traditional Malayalam movies at that time, she was considered as the top and most popular actress of her time.

Career
Seema began her career in Tamil film at the age of 18 as a dancer. She debuted as an actress in director Lisa Baby's Nizhale Nee Sakshi, but this film was shelved. (It was later completed with Vidhubala as heroine.) Veteran actor Vijayan rechristened her name as Seema during the filming of Nizhale Nee Sakshi.

At the age of 26, Seema starred as the heroine in her first movie in Malayalam titled Avalude Ravukal (Her Nights), directed by I. V. Sasi. After a few years of inactivity during 1990s, Seema became active again in 1998 in Olympiyan Anthony Adam. Seema won the Kerala State Film Award for Best Actress in 1984 and in 1985. Vishudha Shanthi, a biography on her life, was published by Didi Damodaran, in 2011. She achieved the Lifetime achievement award at the 59th Idea Filmfare festival at Chennai.

Personal life
She married director I. V. Sasi on 28 August 1980. The couple have two children, one daughter Anu and one son Ani.

Partial filmography

Malayalam

Kattukurangu (1970) 
Nadan Pennu (1970)
Velutha Kathreena (1970)
Padunna Puzha (1971)
Virunnukari (1970)
Karakanakadal (1970) 
Thara (1970) 
Vilaykku Vangiya Veena (1970)
Aadhyathe Kadha (1970)
Kakkathamburatti (1970) 
Line Bus (1970)
Kadalpalam (1971)
Dathuputhran (1971)
Sthree (1971)
Azhakulla Celina (1971)
Mayiladum Kunnu (1971)
CheenaVala (1971)
Love Marriage (1972)
Helo Darling (1972)
 Urangatha Sundari (1972)
Kaattumallika (1972)
Nilakatha Chalanangal (1972)
Thurakkatha Vathil (1972)
Achanum Bappayum (1972)
Kuttyedathi (1972)
Sindhooracheppu (1972)
Nrithashala (1972) 
Samudram (1972)
Aparadhi (1972)
Kanyaka (1972)
Akkarapacha (1972)
Oru Sundariyude Kadha (1972)
Lakshyam (1973)
Aaradhika (1973)
Gayathry (1973)
Divya Darshanam (1973)
Thottavadi (1973)
Nakhangal (1973)
Guruvayoor Keshavan (1973)
Iniyethra Sandhyakal (1973)
Kalachakram (1973)
Thacholi Marumakan Chandu (1973)
Padmatheertham (1973)
Bhoomidevi Pushpiniyayi (1973)
Rajahamsam (1973) 
Nellu (1973)
Alibhabhayum 41 Kallanmarum (1973)
Babumon (1973)
Chennaya Valarthiya Kutty (1974) 
Nee Ente Lahari (1974)
Sethubandhanam (1974) 
Aakramanam (1975)
"Chandhrahasam (1975)
Thirayum Theeravum (1975)
Agnisharam (1975)
Anubhavam (1975) 
Dharmakshethre Kurukshetre (1975)
"Sujatha" (1975)
Poymughangal (1975)
Ayalkkari (1976) 
Sindhooram (1976)
Rajaparambara (1976)
Appoppan (1976) 
AgniPushpam (1977)
Light House (1977) 
Kamadhenu (1977) 
Anujathi (1977) 
Panchami (1977) 
Ankakkuri (1977)
Hemantharathri (1977)
Manasa Vacha Karmana (1977) 
Sreedevi (1977)
Asthamayam (1978)
 Rajayogam  (1978) 
Dhanya  (1978) 
Mochanam (1978)
Irumbazhikal (1978)
Kaathirunna Nimisham (1978)
Sayoojyam (1978) 
Itha Oru Manushyan (1978) 
Puthiya Velicham (1978)
Kamini (1978)
Karipuranda Jeevithangal (1978)
Midukki Ponnamna (1978)
Aval Oru Devalayam (1978)
Kadathanattu Makkam (1978)
Swarangal Swapnangal (1978)
Kalpavruksham (1978)
Aparajitha (1978)
Sammanam (1978)
Ee manohara theeram (1978)
Soothrakkari (1978)
Aadhya Padam (1978)
Adavukal 18 (1978)
Tholkkan Enikku Manasilla (1978) 
Sukradasha (1978)
Hridayame Sakshi (1978)
Randulokam (1978)
Anugraham (1978)
Rowdy Ramu (1978)
Beena (1978)
Orkkuka Vallapozhum (1978)
Balapareekshanam (1978)
Aval Vishwasthayayirunnu (1978)
Madhura Swapnam (1978)
Itha Oru Theeram (1979) 
Ammayum Makalum (1979)
Ivan Ente Priyaputhran (1979)
Pattalam Janaki (1979)
Vaiki Vanna Vasantham (1979)
Parivarthanam (1979) 
Alavudheenum Albutha Vilakkum (1979)
Aashirvadam (1979)
Mattoly (1979) 
Eetta  (1979)
Njan Njan Mathram (1979) 
Anupallavi (1980) 
Visham (1980) 
Garjanam (1980)
Trishoolam (1980) 
Vayanadan Thamban (1980)
Rachana (1980) 
Ithikkara Pakki (1980)
Mamankam (1980)
Aa Nimisham' (1980) Aa Divasam (1980)Ariyapedatha Rahasyam (1980) Kannapanunni (1980)Makam Piranna Manka (1980) Kinnaram (1980) 
 Pushyaraagam (1980)Prathijna (1981)N.G.O Couters (1981)Pappu (1981)Valarthimrigangal (1981) Aadarsham (1981)Trishna (1981)Moorkhan (1981)Angaadi (1981)Thushaaram  (1981) Ente Shathrukkal (1981) 
 Panchapandavar':
Raktham (1981)
Karimpoocha (1981)
Manassoru Maha Samudram (1981) 
Hamsageetham (1981)
Kurukkante Kalyanam (1981)
Avatharam (1981)
Saahasam  (1981)
Alakadalinakkare (1981) 
Attimari (1981) 
Uyarangalil (1981) 
Sathyam (1981) 
Arayannam  (1981) 
Uma Nilayam (1981) 
Akkareyanente Manassm (1981) 
Manasse Ninakku Mangalam (1982)
Sankarsham (1982)
Itha Oru Dhikkari (1982) 
Koritharichanaal (1982)
Orikkal Koodi (1982)
Komaram (1982)
Visham (1982)
Veliyettam (1982)
Oru Mugham Pala Mugham (1982)
Enthino Pookkunna Pookkal (1982)
Sindhoora Sandhyakku Mounam (1982) 
Veshangal (1982) 
Football (1982)
Helo Madras Girl (1982)
Idiyum Minnalum (1982)
Asuran (1982)
Drohi (1982) 
Maattuvin Chattangale (1982)
Enikkum Oru Divasam (1982)
Chiriyo Chiri (1982) as herself
Parasparam (1982)
Pavizhamuthu (1982) 
Love in Tokyo (1982) 
Keni (1982) 
Thadakam (1982)
Arabikadal (1982) 
Surabhi Yaamangal (1982)
Ormayilennum (1982) as Ramani
Ithiri Neram Ithiri Karyam (1982)
Ahimsa (1982)
Aadhipathyam (1982) 
Innallenkil Naale (1982)
Padayani (1983) 
 Asthram (1983)
Rathilayam (1983) 
SandhyaMayangum Neram (1983)
Prashnam Gurudaram (1983)
Oru Madapravinte Kadha (1983) Guest Appearance
Lovely (1983)
Aroodam (1983)
Asuran (1983)
Kathi (1983)
Nanayam (1983)
Iniyenkilum (1983) 
Maniyara (1983)
Mounam Vaachalam (1983) 
America America (1983) 
Ente Kadha (1983)
Ee Nadu (1983) 
Thaavalam (1983)
Deepaaradhana (1983)
Radhayude Kamukan (1984) as Radha
Sandhyakethinu Sindooram  (1984) as Ambili
Nishedi (1984) 
Kodathy (1984) 
Vellam (1984) as Radha
Avarude Sangetham (1984) as Radha
Vanitha Police (1984) as Sasikala
Thirakal (1984) as Sarith
Manithali (1984) as Ramlath
Rakshassu (1984) as Salomy
Oru Kochu Swapnam (1984) 
Inakili (1984) as Mary
Lakshmanarekha (1984) 
Thirakkil Alpam Samayam (1984)
Aksharangal (1984) as Geetha
Aalkkootathil Thaniye (1984) as Ammukutty
Onnanu Nammal (1984) as Nirmala
Kanamarayathu (1984) as Dr. Elsy George
Oru Sumangaliyude Kadha (1984) as Gracy
Kolakomban (1984) as Devyani
Veendum Chalikkunna Chakram (1984)
Oru Thettinte Katha (1984) as Ramani
Sandarbham (1984) as Mary
Adiyozhukkukal (1984) 
Karimbu (1984)
Vellarikka Pattanam (1985) 
Manyamahajanagale (1985) as Sainu
Snehichakuttathinu (1985) as Yamuna
Shantam Beekaram (1985) as Bhadra
Manassile Manpeda (1985) as Rugmini
Janakeeya Kodathi (1985) as Annamma
Oru Vaakku Oru Nokku (1985) as Bettyamma
Mukhya Manthri (1985) as Sumathi
Aa Neram Alppa Dooram (1985) as Uppatty Amma
Gayathri Devi Ente Amma (1985) as 
Ente Ammu Ninte Thulasi Avarude Chakki (1985) as  Elsi
Vasanthasena (1985) as Shylaja Varma
Karimpinoovinakkare (1985) as Gouri
Idanilangal (1985) as  
Anubandham (1985) as Sunandha
CID Nazeer in Bombay (1986)
Aval Kaattirunnu Avanum (1986) as Suhara
Nilavinte Nattil (1986) as Lakshmi
Chekkeraanoru Chilla (1986) as Nandhini
Gandhinagar 2nd Street (1986) as Nirmala Teacher
Vartha (1986) as Radha
Surabhiyamangal (1986) 
Koodanayum Kattu (1986) 
Avanazhi (1986) as Radha
Ee Kaikalil (1986) as Saritha
Orayiram Ormakal (1986) 
Akalangalil (1986) as Vasanthi
Ente Shabdham (1986) 
Iniyum Kurukshethram (1986) 
Njan Kathorthirikkum (1986) 
Ashtabandham (1986) as 
Ayalvasi Oru Daridravasi (1986) as Parvathi
Nadodikattu (1987) as herself
Ithrayum Kaalam (1987) as Shoshamma
Sarvakalasala (1987) as Subadra
Naalkkavala (1987) as Dr. Radha
Adimakal Udamakal (1987) as Radha
Ayitham (1988) as Pappamma
Mattoral (1988) as Susheela
Padhamudra (1988) as Alice
Mukthi (1988) as Radhamma
Vicharana (1988) as Alice
Sangham (1988) as Molykutty
Rahasyam Parama Rahasyam (1988) as Uthara
Thennal (1988) as Annamma
1921 (1988) as Radha
Ormayilennum (1988) as 
Evidence (1988) as Alphonsi
Devadasi (1989) as Vilasini
Mizhiyorangalil (1989) as 
Aazhikkoru Muthu (1989) as 
Mahayanam (1989) as Rajamma
Ashokante Asathikuttikku (1989) as 
Olympian Anthony Adam (1999) as Principal Susamma
Sradha (2000) as Nandhini Balachandran
Kilichundan Mampazham (2003) as Subaidha
Udayam (2004) as Subhadra
Prajapathi (2006) as Indrani
Pranayakalam (2007) 
Nagaram (2007) 
Aayudham (2008) as Anwar's mother
Thirunakkara Perumal (2009) as Lakshmikutty/Achamma
Vella Thooval (2009) as Jiya's mother
Four Friends  (2010) as Surya's mother
Abhinethri (2011) as herself (Archive footage)
Uppukandam Brothers Back in Action (2011) as Kunjannamma
Naadakame Ulakam (2011) as herself
Manushyanum mrugavum (2011) as Jaanu
Geethaanjali (2013) as Annamma
Tharangal (2014) as herself (Archive footage)
Oru Vadakkan Selfie (2015) as herself (Archive footage)
Sir C.P (2015) as Mary
Kinar (2018) as Judge
 Stand Up (2019)  as Dr.Asha
 Kaduva (2022) as Theruthi

Tamil

Telugu

Kannada
 Sowbhagya Lakshmi (1986)
 December 31 (1986)
 Kathanayaka (1986)
 Digvijaya (1987)
 Nigooda Rahasya (1990)
 Jagadeka Veera (1991)

Television career
TV series

Shows

References

External links
 

1957 births
Living people
20th-century Indian actresses
21st-century Indian actresses
Actresses from Chennai
Actresses in Kannada cinema
Actresses in Malayalam cinema
Actresses in Malayalam television
Actresses in Tamil cinema
Actresses in Tamil television
Actresses in Telugu television
Actresses in Telugu cinema
Filmfare Awards South winners
Indian film actresses
Indian television actresses
Kerala State Film Award winners